Manchester Township is one of the fourteen townships of Morgan County, Ohio, United States.  The 2000 census found 141 people in the township.

Geography
Located in the northeastern corner of the county, it borders the following townships:
Brookfield Township, Noble County - north
Sharon Township, Noble County - east
Center Township - south
Meigsville Township - southwest corner
Bristol Township - west
Meigs Township, Muskingum County - northwest corner

No municipalities are located in Manchester Township.

Name and history
Statewide, the only other Manchester Township is located in Adams County.

Government
The township is governed by a three-member board of trustees, who are elected in November of odd-numbered years to a four-year term beginning on the following January 1. Two are elected in the year after the presidential election and one is elected in the year before it. There is also an elected township fiscal officer, who serves a four-year term beginning on April 1 of the year after the election, which is held in November of the year before the presidential election. Vacancies in the fiscal officership or on the board of trustees are filled by the remaining trustees.

As of 2007, the trustees are Steve Houston, Christopher Lewis, and Robert Post, and the clerk is Darlene Cain.

References

External links
County website

Townships in Morgan County, Ohio
Townships in Ohio